Sert may refer to:

 Alternative spelling of Sart, modern Sardis, in Turkey
 Sert, Libya, a city
 Sêrt, Turkey

People with the surname
 Henri Paul Sert (1938–1964)Swedish artist
 Ivana Sert (born 1979), Serbian-Turkish actress
 Josep Lluís Sert, Catalan architect
 Josep Maria Sert, Catalan painter
 Misia Sert (1872–1950), Polish pianist
 Özgür Sert (born 2000), Turkish professional footballer

See also
 SERT (disambiguation)